Princess Baba Jigida is a Sierra Leonean politician. She is a member of the Sierra Leone People's Party (SLPP). She is also a member of the Pan-African Parliament as well as a member of the Parliament of Sierra Leone from the Western Area Rural District outside of Freetown.

References

Year of birth missing (living people)
Living people
Members of the Parliament of Sierra Leone
Members of the Pan-African Parliament from Sierra Leone
Sierra Leone People's Party politicians
21st-century Sierra Leonean women politicians
21st-century Sierra Leonean politicians
Women members of the Pan-African Parliament